The Belfast North by-election of 1896 was held on 22 January 1896.  The by-election was held due to the death of the incumbent Irish Unionist Party MP, Edward Harland.  It was won by the Irish Unionist Party candidate James Horner Haslett.

External links 
A Vision Of Britain Through Time

References

1896 elections in Ireland
19th century in Belfast
By-elections to the Parliament of the United Kingdom in Belfast